Giant's Bread is a novel  by British writer Agatha Christie, first published in the UK by Collins in April 1930 and in the US by Doubleday later in the same year. The UK edition retailed for seven shillings and sixpence (7/6) and the US edition at $1.00. The dust jacket of the first UK edition was by the artist Margaret Macadam.  Giant's Bread is the first of six novels Christie published under the pen name "Mary Westmacott".

Plot summary

The opening of London's National Opera House is celebrated by the performance of a new composition, The Giant. The audience was either puzzled or ecstatic about this modernist piece. One man who does not personally like the composition, but can see the genius that scored it, is Carl Bowerman, an elderly and distinguished music critic, who joins the owner of the Opera House, Sebastian Levinne, for a private drink. Despite the foreign nature of the music, Bowerman recognises that the composer, known as Boris Groen, must be English because "Nationality in music is unmistakable." He states that Groen is the natural successor to a man called Vernon Deyre who was killed in the war. Sebastian politely refuses to tell more about the absent Groen, saying "There are reasons..."

In the late years of the Victorian era, Vernon Deyre was a small boy growing up in the old country house of the Deyre family, Abbots Puisannts. He was the only child of Walter, a soldier by profession, and Myra Deyre who was something of an emotional and clinging person.  Walter is a sad figure who is not in love with his wife and is subject to various dalliances. Vernon's nurse – an important figure in his childhood – raises him, but he has no friends. In their place he has four imaginary friends, the most important of whom is called Mr. Green, a florid man who loves playing games and who lives in a wood that borders on the grounds of Abbots Puisannts.

One of the main male figures in Vernon's life is his Uncle Sydney, Myra's brother who is a self-made man who runs a manufacturing business in Birmingham and is someone with whom Vernon instinctively feels uncomfortable. Someone who promotes a different reaction is Walter's sister, Nina, an artistic woman who impresses Vernon by her playing of the grand piano in the house. This is an object for which Vernon has an unreasoning terror, naming it "The Beast", as it promotes a hatred of music in his soul.

Aunt Nina's marriage breaks up and Walter wants her and her young daughter Josephine (Joe) to live with them, but Myra objects. Fate takes a turn though when the Boer War breaks out and Walter goes off to fight. In his absence, whilst Vernon is away at school, Nina dies and Myra takes Joe in. As a result, Vernon has a playmate in the holidays and the two start to make a circle of acquaintances. One of them, Nell Vereker, is a thin girl who cannot keep up with Vernon and Joe in their games. The local village is aghast when the property adjoining Abbots Puisannts is bought by a rich Jewish family called the Levinnes and, although held at arm's length at first, gradually the family come to be held in a grudging acceptance. Vernon and Joe also make friends with the son of the family – Sebastian, who is about the same age as them. A few weeks before the end of the war, Walter Deyre is killed in action and Vernon inherits Abbots Puisannts, though as he is not of age so it is held in trust for him. A shortage of money means that Myra and her son have to move, and they rent the house out while they move to Birmingham to be near Uncle Sydney.

Eleven years pass. Vernon and Sebastian have remained friends through their time at Eton and Cambridge. Sebastian's father has died in the intervening years and he, unlike Vernon, has inherited millions. Sebastian is starting on his career as a patron of the arts, opening a gallery in Bond Street, while Joe has artistic tastes and Vernon is at a loose end as to what he wants to do – money, or the lack of it, still being a concern. He has a life-changing moment when he is forced to attend a charity concert at the Albert Hall and suddenly overcomes his childhood hatred of music, so much so that he declares that he wants to be a composer. Vernon reaches twenty-one and is bitter to learn that his financial situation means that he cannot afford to move back to Abbots Puisannts. He is forced to agree that he will work at Uncle Sydney's firm, but life takes a different tack when, after a gap of several years, he meets Nell Vereker again at Cambridge. She has grown into a beautiful young woman and Vernon falls in love with her. He is opposed by Nell's mother, who has brought her up to be a lady – despite being desperately short of money herself – and is determined that Nell will marry riches. Her preferred candidate for her daughter's hand is an American called George Chetwynd. Uncle Sydney is also opposed to Vernon marrying Nell and persuades him to wait until he is more established.

One night, while Nell and her mother are abroad, Vernon is introduced to a professional singer called Jane Harding at a party hosted by Sebastian. He is attracted to Jane, despite a ten-year age difference, and starts to see her, to Joe's approval but Myra Deyre's consternation. Jane's effect on Vernon is to apply himself more to composing music and, to do so, he leaves his uncle's firm. Nell is frightened of Jane and confronts her, but the older, more experienced girl is more than a match for Nell. Vernon finishes his composition and, suddenly scared of rumours that Nell is going to marry George Chetwynd, proposes to her, but she asks him to wait.

Events reach a crisis point when Joe absconds with a married man, and this prompts Vernon to accuse Nell of not having that sort of courage. This outburst merely prompts her into getting engaged to Chetwynd with whom, as she tells Vernon, she "feels safe". On the rebound, Vernon starts a relationship with Jane. He also finishes his composition which Sebastian produces and in which Jane sings. The piece receives warm reviews. The First World War is declared on 4 August 1914 and four days later Nell sees Vernon again and confesses that she still loves him. Hearing that he has enlisted, she agrees to be his wife and they are married later that afternoon.

Six months later, Vernon is sent to France and Nell becomes a VAD nurse, finding the work and the treatment meted out to volunteers like her hard to take. After some time she receives a telegram to say that Vernon has been killed in action. Several months pass and George Chetwynd meets Nell briefly, before he goes off to Serbia to carry out relief work, and promises to keep in touch with her. Nell has, through her widowhood, inherited Abbots Puisannts and she makes a move that Vernon never could by selling the house. She finds out that Chetwynd has bought it and he invites Nell and her mother to visit him at the house where he proposes to her. She accepts and they marry.

It is 1917. In neutral Holland, Vernon turns up one night at an inn, having escaped from a prisoner of war camp in Germany. The daughter of the woman who runs the inn gives him some old English magazines to read and a letter for a soldier she knew called Corporal Green. Struck by the man having the same name as his imaginary childhood friend, he happily agrees but is then dumbstruck to read in one of the magazines of Nell and George's marriage. He staggers into the night and throws himself in the path of a coming truck. Two years later a man called George Green is the chauffeur of a rich American who found the man in Holland suffering from loss of memory after an "accident" and working as a driver. They are back in England now and George's employer visits Chetwynd, an acquaintance, at Abbots Puisannts. By coincidence, Jane Harding is also visiting the house that day. She has lost her singing voice and is now an actress appearing locally with a repertory company. Chetwynd has invited her to tea. She and Nell meet, and their mutual animosity to each other is clear, but Nell receives a greater shock when she catches sight of their American visitor's chauffeur and realises that Vernon is still alive. Jane also recognises Vernon in the nearby town and hurriedly summons Sebastian down there by telegram. They get Vernon professional help and he slowly starts to recover his memory and has a proper reunion with Nell, while Chetwynd, unaware of what has happened, is away. Vernon wants to take up where he left off, although he accepts the loss of Abbots Puisannts, but Nell, afraid, lies to him that she is pregnant. Disconsolate, Jane takes him away, no one else being aware that he is alive, but not before she has confronted Nell with her lie.

The two go to Moscow where Vernon is taken up with Meyerhold and the Avant-garde music of the new movements in Russia. They suddenly receive a telegram saying that Joe is dangerously ill in New York City and they sail across to see her. On the way, the ship hits an iceberg and starts to sink. In the confusion of the evacuation, as the ship starts to tilt badly and go down into the water, Vernon sees Nell, she and Chetwynd having been on board but sailing in a different class of passengers. She cries out to Vernon to save her and he does so, watching Jane's horrified face as she goes "down into that green swirl..." Back safely in New York, Vernon confesses to Sebastian that he let the love of his life die. Sebastian is furious but the emotional shock to Vernon causes him to regain his passion and talent for composing. He begins The Giant, oblivious to all else, even Nell who visits him to admit that she still loves him. He rebuffs her, his only concern now being for his music.

Literary significance and reception
The Times Literary Supplement reviewed the book on 29 May 1930. The reviewer, unaware of the true identity of the author, praised the "arresting prologue" and stated that the early years of Vernon Deyre were "described with charm and capture the child's point of view."

The review in The New York Times Book Review (17 August 1930) declared, "Whoever is concealed beneath the pseudonym of Mary Westmacott may well feel proud of Giant's Bread. The blurb lends mystery to Miss Westmacott's identity. She has written half a dozen successful books under her own name, it says, but they have been so different from Giant's Bread that she decided to have it 'judged on its own merits and not in the light of previous success.' Who she is does not matter, for her book is far above the average of current fiction, in fact, comes well under the classification of a 'good book.' And it is only a satisfying novel that can claim that appellation. In Giant's Bread there are traces of the careful, detailed writing of the English novelist, and there are hints of Mary Roberts Rinehart's methods of mentioning a finished episode and explaining later how it all happened." The review concluded, "Each figure is well conceived, human and true."

Gerald Gould reviewed the novel in the 4 May 1930 issue of The Observer when he wrote, "Giant's Bread is an ambitious and surprisingly sentimental story about a young man with musical genius, mixed love-affairs, a lost memory, a family tradition, and other commodities out of the bag of novelist's tricks. Miss Westmacott shows narrative talent; but would presumably be more original if she strained less after originality. I should expect her book to be very popular."

References to other works
In Book III, Chapter I(i) Jane Harding quotes the line "Come, tell me how you live!" from verse three of the White Knight's poem, "Haddocks' Eyes", from Chapter eight of Through the Looking-Glass (1871) by Lewis Carroll. This quote was later used by Christie as the title of her 1946 book of travel literature.

Publication history
The dedication of the book reads: "To the memory of my best and truest friend, my mother."

 1930, William Collins and Sons (London), April 1930, Hardcover, 448 pp
 1930, Doubleday (New York), 1930, Hardcover, 358 pp
 1964, Dell Books (New York), Paperback, 320 pp
 1973, Arbor House (New York), Hardcover, 312 pp; 
 1975, Fontana Books (Imprint of HarperCollins), Paperback, 288 pp; 
 1980, Ulverscroft Large-print Edition, Hardcover, 577 pp;

References

External links
Giant's Bread at the official Agatha Christie website 

1930 British novels
Novels by Agatha Christie
Works published under a pseudonym
William Collins, Sons books
Novels set in Victorian England
Works set in country houses